Bruce Phillip Smith (February 8, 1920 – August 28, 1967), nicknamed "Boo", was an American football player best known for winning the Heisman Trophy in 1941.

Smith was born in Faribault, Minnesota, where he excelled in high school football under the coach Win Brockmeyer at Faribault High School. The football field at Faribault High is now named after Smith. He attended the University of Minnesota, playing halfback for the back-to-back national champion Gophers in 1940 and 1941. Smith was captain of the 1941 Minnesota team. He received the Heisman two days after the attack on Pearl Harbor.  Smith earned first-team All-American and All-Big Ten Conference honors in 1941.

During World War II, he served as a United States Navy fighter pilot. After the war, he briefly played in the National Football League (NFL) with the Green Bay Packers (1945–1948) and the Los Angeles Rams (1948).

The movie Smith of Minnesota was released in 1942. The premiere occurred in his home town of Faribault, Minnesota, to the amazement of the locals due to this novelty. However, laughter was heard in the movie house when certain advanced technologies, for that time (direct-dial phones, streetlights, etc.) were seen as part of the scenery—courtesy of being filmed in Hollywood, California.

Smith was diagnosed with cancer in the spring of 1967, and he spent the next several months visiting young cancer patients with the Rev. William Cantwell. Smith lost over half his body weight before succumbing to the disease. Cantwell, who was unfamiliar with Smith's sports achievements, nominated Smith for sainthood.

In 1972, Smith was inducted into the College Football Hall of Fame. His number 54 was the first to be officially retired by the Minnesota Gophers in 1977.

References

External links
 
 
 
 

1920 births
1967 deaths
American football halfbacks
Great Lakes Navy Bluejackets football players
Green Bay Packers players
Los Angeles Rams players
Minnesota Golden Gophers football players
Saint Mary's Pre-Flight Air Devils football players
All-American college football players
College Football Hall of Fame inductees
Heisman Trophy winners
United States Navy pilots of World War II
People from Alexandria, Minnesota
People from Faribault, Minnesota
Players of American football from Minnesota
Deaths from cancer in Minnesota
Military personnel from Minnesota